Nagwa El Desouki (born 2 April 1971 in Altstätten) is a Swiss slalom canoeist who competed from the mid-1990s to the late 2000s (decade). Competing in two Summer Olympics, she earned her best finish of sixth in the K-1 event in Athens in 2004.

References
Sports-Reference.com profile

1971 births
Canoeists at the 1996 Summer Olympics
Canoeists at the 2004 Summer Olympics
Living people
Olympic canoeists of Switzerland
Swiss female canoeists
People from Altstätten
Sportspeople from the canton of St. Gallen